Placidium acarosporoides (Mojave stipllescale) is a glossy reddish to dark brown or black squamulose lichen dotted with black perithecia that grows on rock.

References

Verrucariales